Out on a Limb is an album by composer, arranger and conductor Pete Rugolo featuring performances recorded in 1956 and originally released on the EmArcy label as a 12-inch LP. Tracks from this album were later released in stereo on Music from Out of Space and Rugolo Meets Rhythm.

Track listing
All compositions by Pete Rugolo, except where indicated.
 "Don't Play the Melody" - 2:35
 "In a Modal Tone" - 2:53
 "Early Duke" - 4:12
 "Nancy" (Jimmy Van Heusen, Phil Silvers) - 2:30
 "Sunday, Monday or Always" (Van Heusen, Johnny Burke) - 3:30
 "The Boy Next Door" (Ralph Blane, Hugh Martin) - 4:15
 "Cha-Lito Linda" - 2:30
 "Ballade for Drums" - 3:25
 "Smoke Gets in Your Eyes" (Jerome Kern, Otto Harbach) - 4:07
 "Repetitious Riff" - 2:38

Recorded in Los Angeles, CA on July 9, 1956 (track 9), July 10, 1956 (tracks 1 & 6), July 11, 1956 (tracks 2, 3 & 7) and October 29, 1956 (tracks 4, 5, 8 & 10).

Personnel
Pete Rugolo - arranger, conductor
Pete Candoli (tracks 1-8 & 10), Don Fagerquist (tracks 2-5, 7, 8 & 10), Maynard Ferguson (tracks 1-8 & 10), Ray Linn (tracks 1-8 & 10), Don Paladino (tracks 1 & 6) - trumpet  
Milt Bernhart, Herbie Harper, Frank Rosolino - trombone (tracks 1-8 & 10)
George Roberts - bass trombone (tracks 1-8 & 10)
John Cave, Vincent DeRosa - French horn (tracks 1-8 & 10)
Clarence Karella (tracks 1-3, 6 & 7), Jay McAllister (tracks 4, 5, 8 & 10) - tuba
Harry Klee - alto saxophone, alto flute, piccolo
Ronny Lang (tracks 1-3, 6, 7 & 9) Bud Shank (tracks 4, 5, 8 & 10) -  alto saxophone, flute
Gene Cipriano (tracks 1-3, 6, 7 & 9), Bob Cooper (tracks 4, 5, 8 & 10), Dave Pell - tenor saxophone
Chuck Gentry (tracks 1-3, 6, 7 & 9), Jimmy Giuffre (tracks 4, 5, 8 & 10) - baritone saxophone
Russ Freeman - piano
Barney Kessell (tracks 4, 5, 8 & 10), Howard Roberts (tracks 1-3, 6, 7 & 9) - guitar 
Joe Mondragon - bass
Shelly Manne - drums

References

1957 albums
Pete Rugolo albums
EmArcy Records albums
Albums arranged by Pete Rugolo
Albums conducted by Pete Rugolo

Albums recorded at Capitol Studios